Dinner with Raphael is a 2009 American short comedy film written and directed by Joey Boukadakis, starring Dianna Agron, Paul Boukadakis, Michael Bower, Brett Paesel and Richard Riehle.

The film was produced by Mary Pat Bentel, Joey Boukadakis and Josh McGuire.

Cast
Dianna Agron as Dianna
Paul Boukadakis as Paul Siegfried
Michael Bower as Raphael/Jimmy Siegfried
Brett Paesel as Mrs. Siegfried
Richard Riehle as Mr. Siegfried
Joey Boukadakis as Wedding Guest

References

External links
 

2009 films
2009 comedy films
2009 short films
American comedy short films
2000s English-language films